Voyage is an Irish folk music album by Christy Moore. The album features songs of a political nature, however unlike Moore's past releases, the subjects aren't limited to Ireland specific issues. Sinéad O'Connor sings "Middle of the Island" with Moore.

Track listing
 "Mystic Lipstick" (Jimmy McCarthy)
 "The Voyage" (Johnny Duhan)
 "The Mad Lady & Me" (Jimmy McCarthy)
 "The Deportees Club" (Elvis Costello)
 "The Night Visit" (Traditional, Christy Moore)
 "All For The Roses" (Tony Boylan, Wally Page)
 "Missing You" (Jimmy McCarthy)
 "Bright Blue Rose" (Jimmy McCarthy)
 "Farewell to Pripyat" (Tim Dennehy) 
 "Musha God Help Her" (Pierce Turner)
 "The First Time Ever I Saw Your Face" (Ewan MacColl)
 "Middle of the Island" (Christy Moore, Nigel Rolfe)

References

Christy Moore albums
1989 albums